Tier One Entertainment Inc. is a Southeast Asian esports and video gaming-oriented entertainment agency. It maintains the Blacklist International esports team.

History
Tier One Entertainment was founded in 2017 by Filipino cosplayer Alodia Gosiengfiao, esports player Tryke Gutierrez and entrepreneur Brian Lim. It had its launch on April 21, 2017. Registered in Singapore, Tier One was promoted as the Philippines' "first gaming and esports talent agency". The company would establish presence in other countries in Southeast Asia including Malaysia, Myanmar, and Vietnam.

Tier One launched its esports brand, Blacklist International in 2020. The launch followed Tier One's absorption of  Evos' Mobile Legends roster.

In 2021, Tier One secured pre-Series A funding through the venture capital firm Gobi Partners. The company also entered a deal with Japanese internet firm KAYAC and the Warner Music Group marking Tier One's expansion to Japan.

Esports

Tier One Entertainment through Blacklist International runs esports team competing in Call of Duty: Mobile, PUBG, Mobile Legends: Bang Bang, Dota 2 and Garena Free Fire.

Talents
Tier One manages roughly more than 1,000 talents across its main brand and Amplify as of October 2021. Amplify is a streamer collective brand. People affiliated with Tier One includes shoutcasters, esports players, and influencers.

Project 4 is Tier One's four-member idol group which was established in 2021.

Media
In June 2021, Tier One launched The Gaming House, a reality series open to gaming streamers and content creators. Ten contestants would reside in the house dubbed as the Payamansion for a chance to become a Tier One talent. This reality series was aired via Kapamilya Online Live every weekends from August to December 2021.

References

2017 establishments in Singapore
2017 establishments in the Philippines
Esports in the Philippines
Esports organizations
Companies of Singapore
Mass media companies of the Philippines
Mass media companies of Singapore
Talent agencies of the Philippines
Sports management companies